Rechukka is a 1955 Indian Telugu-language swashbuckler film directed by  P. Pullaiah. The film stars N. T. Rama Rao and Anjali Devi, with music composed by Aswatthama. The story was inspired by The Prince Who Was a Thief (1951), starring Tony Curtis.

The film was remade in Tamil and titled Naattiya Thara. The Tamil version was released in 1955. Thanjai N. Ramaiah Dass wrote the dialogues and lyrics for the Tamil version, while G. Ramanathan scored the music. It was also a commercial hit. Aaroor Dass, who was a successful screenplay writer later, started his career as an assistant to Thanjai N. Ramaiah Dass in 1955 and assisted in writing the dialogues for this film. He has said that he named his first child as Arokyamary and also gave a pet name, Thara Devi in remembrance of the film Nattiya Thara.

Plot 
King Devarayalu (Mukkamala) celebrates his son Kumararayulu's birthday when Mahamantri (Sadasiva Rao) expresses his desire to couple up his daughter Lalitha Devi with the Prince but Devarayalu scorns him. Offended Mahamantri ploys with his henchmen Nagulu (Y. V. Raju) and seizes the King when Veeranna (Nagabhushanam) aide of the King, absconds with the prince. To distract the chasers' attention, he hides the prince and runs in a different direction. Here a snake bites Kumararayalu when he is rescued by a tribal leader Jogulu (Gaadepalli) and recognizes him but maintains secrecy. On the other side, Veerana, failing to find Kumararayalu returns home, explains the turbulence to his wife & daughter Nana and moves to extricate the king but he was caught. Years roll by, Kumararayalu grows up as Kanna (N. T. Rama Rao) in the tribal hamlet and Nana (Anjali Devi), becomes a street dancer. In the prison, Veeranna passes away, utilizing the situation the King escapes in the bag kept for Veeranna and takes shelter at Nana's house. Once, on the occasion of Lalitha Devi's (Devika) birthday, Nana entertains her when she notices Mahamantri bestowing a diamond necklace of the former queen to the princess and snatches it. At that point in time, Kanna lands at the fort and promises to get back the necklace. Kanna retrieves it from Nana, in that process, both of them fall in love. Thereafter, Kanna handovers it to the princess when she too starts loving him. Learning it, Kanna meets Lalitha and tries to explain her as a wrong deed to love him when he is captured by soldiers. Meanwhile, Mahamantri & Nagulu finds out that the king is alive, they even mistake Kanna as his ally and tortures him. Nana overhears the conversation and recognizes the person staying in her home as the king. On his guidance, Nana steals the royal assent Rajamudra and releases Kanna. Kanna delivers the royal assent to the king when a quarrel erupts between them as he left Nana alone in the fort. In combat, the king recognizes Kanna as his son. Nevertheless, Kanna takes an oath to safeguard Nana, so, he again checks into the fort but clawed. During that plight, the king reaches the tribal hamlet by them he surrounds the fort. Parallelly, Kanna plays a trick, attacks the soldiers and ceases Mahamantri. On the verge of death, Mahamantri kills Nagulu leaving his daughter's responsibility to the King Devarayalu. Finally, the movie ends on a happy note with the marriage of Kanna & Nana.

Cast 
 N. T. Rama Rao as Kumarayalu / Kannaiah 
 Anjali Devi as Nana
 Devika as Lalitha Devi
 Mukkamala as Maharaju Devarayalu
 Nagabhushanam as Veeranna
 Sadasiva Rao as Mahamantri
 Peketi Sivaram as Annayya
 Joga Rao as Chandrayya
 Y. V. Raju as Nagulu

Soundtrack 
Music composed by Aswatthama. Lyrics by Malladi Ramakrishna Sastry. Music released by Audio Company.

Production 
The Rechukka film is an outcome of Ghantasala Balaramaiah, Telugu film producer of Pratibha Pictures and General Manager and Production Executive of the company Thopalli Venkata Sundara Shivarama Sastry (better known as Pratibha Sastry). Sastry has seen the English film entitled The Prince Who Was a Thief in Mount Road. Balaramaiah prepared a story to suit the local audience. The story was given to Malladi Ramakrishna Sastry, who wrote the screenplay, dialogues and lyrics for the film.

The shooting was started with N. T. Rama Rao, Anjali Devi and supporting staff and Ashwathamma as Music director. After shooting three reels including two songs, Ghantasala Balaramaiah died suddenly due to Heart attack on 29 October 1953. Ghantasala Krishna Murthy, the elder son of Balaramaiah has taken the charge of Pratibha pictures. Nageshwara Rao wished to be a part of the film after the demise of his mentor Balaramaiah. He made a cameo appearance. The film is completed with the financial involvement of Sunderlal Nahata and director P. Pullaiah.

Most of the film was shot at Revathi Studios at Madras. Prakash Studios was used for few important scenes. The forest scenes are pictured at Jamal Gardens (Now Vijaya Gardens).

For the role of Lalitha Devi, they wanted to take a new actress. They have chosen Prameela, the grand daughter of Raghupathi Venkaiah to portray the character besides N. T. Rama Rao. She changed her name as Devika and became a big star in later years.

Box-office 
The film was a commercial hit and ran for more than 100 days in three centres in Andhra Pradesh. Centenary celebrations are organized at Vijayawada.

References

External links 
 
  - song scored and sung by G. Ramanathan

1954 films
1950s Telugu-language films
Films directed by P. Pullayya
Indian drama films
1954 drama films
Indian black-and-white films